Rizvand (also Romanized as Rīzvand and Rīz Vand; also known as Rīzehvand) is a village in Mahidasht Rural District, Mahidasht District, Kermanshah County, Kermanshah Province, Iran. At the 2006 census, its population was 392, in 94 families.

References 

Populated places in Kermanshah County